"Stranglehold" is a song by American rock musician Ted Nugent, as well as the debut single and the first track from his self-titled debut 1975 album. The vocals are by Derek St. Holmes. However, the "Sometimes you wanna get higher" verse is sung by Nugent. Nugent admits that the song was co-written by Rob Grange, who received no share.

"Stranglehold" is a guitar-driven track, over eight minutes long, and set the stage for Nugent's career. The guitar solo was recorded in a single take. "I used delays to create this really wild guitar duet with Ted," said producer Tom Werman. "It was like two guys were playing. I sent it off to Ted for his approval. He called me up and said, 'I love what you did with Stranglehold, but don't ever do that again without asking me.'"

It became an entrance theme to the NHL team Chicago Blackhawks. It was also the entrance theme used by Kevin Von Erich in his professional wrestling career.

Reception
"Stranglehold" has been ranked as the 31st greatest guitar solo of all time by Guitar World.

See also

Ted Nugent discography

References

Ted Nugent songs
Songs written by Ted Nugent
1975 songs
1975 debut singles
Song recordings produced by Tom Werman
Epic Records singles